Praseodymium(III) nitrate is a green-colored chemical compound with the chemical formula Pr(NO3)3. It is very hygroscopic and forms a hexahydrate. It is soluble in polar solvents.

Uses
Praseodymium(III) nitrate is used in fluorescent display tubes and phosphors. It is also used in the ultrasonic synthesis of praseodymium molybdate. It also plays a role in the preparation in lanthanide oxysulfides.

References

Praseodymium compounds
Nitrates
Phosphors and scintillators